Streltzovia is a genus of moths in the subfamily Arctiinae from East Asia. By general appearance, it is very similar to Spilosoma species, but male genitalia are different. The genus consists of only one species, Streltzovia caeria, which is found China.

Subspecies 
 Streltzovia caeria caeria (China: Qinghai, Gansu, Nei Mongol)
 Streltzovia caeria mienshanica (Daniel, 1943) (China: Hebei, Shanxi, Shaanxi, Nei Mongol, Heilongjiang)
 Streltzovia caeria streltzovi (Dubatolov, 1996) (China: northern Heilongjiang)

References
 , 2008: On the systematic position of Spilosoma caeria (Pungeler, 1906) and Spilosoma mienshanicum Daniel, 1943 (Lepidoptera, Arctiidae). Atalanta 39 (1/4): 367-374, 9 figs., pl. 15-17, Würzburg.
Natural History Museum Lepidoptera generic names catalog

Spilosomina
Moths of Asia
Monotypic moth genera